Tom Perry is the name of:

 L. Tom Perry (1922–2015), American businessman and religious leader
 Tom Perry (politician), Canadian politician and medical doctor
 Tom Perry (footballer) (1870–1927), England international footballer
 Tom Perry (speedway rider) (born 1993), British speedway and grasstrack rider

See also
Lee Tom Perry (born 1951), business professor, Mormon leader, and hymnwriter
Tommy Perry (born 1980), American football coach
Thomas Perry (disambiguation)